The 2019 CS Asian Open Figure Skating Trophy was held in November 2019 in Dongguan, China. It was part of the 2019–20 ISU Challenger Series. Medals were awarded in the disciplines of men's singles, ladies' singles, and ice dance.

The International Skating Union announced on July 22, 2019 that the Asian Open Figure Skating Trophy would replace the canceled Asian Open Figure Skating Classic on the same dates.

Entries 
The International Skating Union published the full list of entries on October 3, 2019.

Changes to preliminary assignments

Results

Men

Ladies

Ice dance

References 

Asian Figure Skating Trophy